My Husband Is Marvelous (French: Mon mari est merveilleux) is a 1952 French comedy film directed by André Hunebelle and starring Fernand Gravey, Sophie Desmarets and Elina Labourdette. The film's sets were designed by the art director Lucien Carré. While a follow-up to the 1951 film My Wife Is Formidable which had the same director and cast, it is not a sequel.

Synopsis
Sylvia, a journalist, tries to uses subterfuge in order to gain an interview with Claude a writer who tries to maintain a reclusive, misanthropic image.

Cast
 Fernand Gravey as Claude Chatel  
 Sophie Desmarets as Sylvia Corbier  
 Elina Labourdette as Micheline  
 Jacques Dynam as L'efféminé 
 Mady Berry as Germaine  
 Anne Carrère as La snob  
 Made Siamé as La vieille dame 
 Pierre Larquey as Le père Henri  
 Jacques Castelot as Christian
 Georgette Anys as L'aubergiste  
 Henri Arius as Le patron du bistrot  
 Madeleine Barbulée 
 Charles Bouillaud 
 Louis Bugette as Roger  
 Gérard Buhr 
 Lucien Callamand as Un ami 
 José Casa 
 Simone Chambord 
 Paul Clérouc as Le valet  
 Paul Demange as Basset  
 Pierre Duverger 
 Giani Esposito as Un journaliste  
 Paul Faivre as Le rédacteur en chef  
 Lucien Frégis 
 Claude Garbe 
 Julien Maffre 
 Judith Magre 
 Mauricet as Le ministre  
 Ida Montagne 
 Georges Spanelly 
 Charles Vissières as Le membre de l'institut

References

Bibliography 
 Philippe Rège. Encyclopedia of French Film Directors, Volume 1. Scarecrow Press, 2009.

External links 
 

1952 comedy films
French comedy films
1952 films
1950s French-language films
Films directed by André Hunebelle
French black-and-white films
1950s French films